CenturyTel of the Gem State, Inc. is a telephone operating company providing local telephone services in Idaho and northern Nevada owned by CenturyLink.

The company was established in 1901 as the Gem State Utilities Corporation. The company was acquired by Telephone Utilities in 1966 as the first company TU would acquire to expand its footprint.

The state of Nevada approved the company's request to provide telephone service in the state in 1973. The company became CenturyTel of the Gem State, Inc. in 1998.

The company was part of Pacific Telecom until 1997, when it was acquired by Century Telephone. Following this acquisition, Century Telephone launched its rebranding as "CenturyTel" and changed the name of the holding company Pacific Telecom to CenturyTel of the Northwest. Gem State Utilities then changed its name to CenturyTel of the Gem State, Inc.

References

Lumen Technologies
Communications in Idaho
Communications in Nevada
Telecommunications companies of the United States
Telecommunications companies established in 1901
1901 establishments in Idaho